In atomic physics, the electron magnetic moment, or more specifically the electron magnetic dipole moment, is the magnetic moment of an electron resulting from its intrinsic properties of spin and electric charge. The value of the electron magnetic moment is   The electron magnetic moment has been measured to an accuracy of  relative to the Bohr magneton.

Magnetic moment of an electron
The electron is a charged particle with charge −, where  is the unit of elementary charge. Its angular momentum comes from two types of rotation: spin and orbital motion. From classical electrodynamics, a rotating distribution of electric charge produces a magnetic dipole, so that it behaves like a tiny bar magnet. One consequence is that an external magnetic field exerts a torque on the electron magnetic moment that depends on the orientation of this dipole with respect to the field.

If the electron is visualized as a classical rigid body in which the mass and charge have identical distribution and motion that is rotating about an axis with angular momentum , its magnetic dipole moment  is given by:

where e is the electron rest mass. The angular momentum L in this equation may be the spin angular momentum, the orbital angular momentum, or the total angular momentum. The ratio between the true spin magnetic moment and that predicted by this model is a dimensionless factor , known as the electron -factor:

It is usual to express the magnetic moment in terms of the reduced Planck constant  and the Bohr magneton B:

Formal definition
Classical notions such as the center of charge and mass are, however,  hard to make precise for a quantum elementary particle. In practice the  definition used by experimentalists comes from the  form factors  
appearing in the matrix element 

of the electromagnetic current operator between two on-shell states. The  form factor  is the electron's charge,  is its static magnetic dipole moment, and  provides the formal definion of the electron's electric dipole moment. The remaining form factor  would, if non zero, be the anapole moment.

Spin magnetic dipole moment
The spin magnetic moment is intrinsic for an electron. It is

Here  is the electron spin angular momentum. The spin -factor is approximately two: . The magnetic moment of an electron is approximately twice what it should be in classical mechanics. The factor of two implies that the electron appears to be twice as effective in producing a magnetic moment as the corresponding classical charged body.

The spin magnetic dipole moment is approximately one B because  and the electron is a spin- particle:
 

The  component of the electron magnetic moment is

where s is the spin quantum number. Note that  is a negative constant multiplied by the spin, so the magnetic moment is antiparallel to the spin angular momentum.

The spin g-factor  comes from the Dirac equation, a fundamental equation connecting the electron's spin with its electromagnetic properties. Reduction of the Dirac equation for an electron in a magnetic field to its non-relativistic limit yields the Schrödinger equation with a correction term, which takes account of the interaction of the electron's intrinsic magnetic moment with the magnetic field giving the correct energy.

For the electron spin, the most accurate value for the spin -factor has been experimentally determined to have the value

Note that this differs only marginally from the value from the Dirac equation. The small correction is known as the anomalous magnetic dipole moment of the electron; it arises from the electron's interaction with virtual photons in quantum electrodynamics. A triumph of the quantum electrodynamics theory is the accurate prediction of the electron g-factor. The CODATA value for the electron magnetic moment is

Orbital magnetic dipole moment
The revolution of an electron around an axis through another object, such as the nucleus, gives rise to the orbital magnetic dipole moment. Then the orbital magnetic dipole moment is

Here L is the electron orbital -factor and B is the Bohr magneton. The value of L is exactly equal to one, by a quantum-mechanical argument analogous to the derivation of the classical gyromagnetic ratio.

Total magnetic dipole moment
The total magnetic dipole moment resulting from both spin and orbital angular momenta of an electron is related to the total angular momentum  by a similar equation:

The -factor J is known as the Landé g-factor, which can be related to L and S by quantum mechanics. See Landé g-factor for details.

Example: hydrogen atom
For a hydrogen atom, an electron occupying the atomic orbital  , the magnetic dipole moment is given by

The  component of the orbital magnetic dipole moment for an electron with a magnetic quantum number ℓ is given by

History
The electron magnetic moment is intrinsically connected to electron spin and was first hypothesized during the early models of the atom in the early twentieth century. The first to introduce the idea of electron spin was Arthur Compton in his 1921 paper on investigations of ferromagnetic substances with X-rays. In Compton's article, he wrote: "Perhaps the most natural, and certainly the most generally accepted view of the nature of the elementary magnet, is that the revolution of electrons in orbits within the atom give to the atom as a whole the properties of a tiny permanent magnet." That same year Otto Stern proposed an experiment carried out later called the Stern–Gerlach experiment in which silver atoms in a magnetic field were deflected in opposite directions of distribution. This pre-1925 period marked the old quantum theory built upon the Bohr-Sommerfeld model of the atom with its classical elliptical electron orbits. During the period between 1916 and 1925, much progress was being made concerning the arrangement of electrons in the periodic table. In order to explain the Zeeman effect in the Bohr atom, Sommerfeld proposed that electrons would be based on three 'quantum numbers', n, k, and m, that described the size of the orbit, the shape of the orbit, and the direction in which the orbit was pointing. Irving Langmuir had explained in his 1919 paper regarding electrons in their shells, "Rydberg has pointed out that these numbers are obtained from the series . The factor two suggests a fundamental two-fold symmetry for all stable atoms." This  configuration was adopted by Edmund Stoner, in October 1924 in his paper 'The Distribution of Electrons Among Atomic Levels' published in the Philosophical Magazine. Wolfgang Pauli hypothesized that this required a fourth quantum number with a two-valuedness.

Electron spin in the Pauli and Dirac theories

Starting from here the charge of the electron is   . The necessity of introducing half-integral spin goes back experimentally to the results of the Stern–Gerlach experiment. A beam of atoms is run through a strong non-uniform magnetic field, which then splits into  parts depending on the intrinsic angular momentum of the atoms. It was found that for silver atoms, the beam was split in two—the ground state therefore could not be integral, because even if the intrinsic angular momentum of the atoms were as small as possible, 1, the beam would be split into 3 parts, corresponding to atoms with  = −1, 0, and +1. Pauli set up a theory which explained this splitting by introducing a two-component wave function and a corresponding correction term in the Hamiltonian, representing a semi-classical coupling of this wave function to an applied magnetic field, as so:

Here  is the magnetic vector potential and  the electric potential, both representing the electromagnetic field, and  = are the Pauli matrices. On squaring out the first term, a residual interaction with the magnetic field is found, along with the usual classical Hamiltonian of a charged particle interacting with an applied field:

This Hamiltonian is now a 2 × 2 matrix, so the Schrödinger equation based on it must use a two-component wave function. Pauli had introduced the 2 × 2 sigma matrices as pure phenomenology — Dirac now had a theoretical argument that implied that spin was somehow the consequence of incorporating relativity into quantum mechanics. On introducing the external electromagnetic 4-potential into the Dirac equation in a similar way, known as minimal coupling, it takes the form (in natural units  =  = 1)

What is more, the value of the gyromagnetic ratio of the electron, standing in front of Pauli's new term, is explained from first principles. This was a major achievement of the Dirac equation and gave physicists great faith in its overall correctness. The Pauli theory may be seen as the low energy limit of the Dirac theory in the following manner. First the equation is written in the form of coupled equations for 2-spinors with the units restored:

so

Assuming the field is weak and the motion of the electron non-relativistic, we have the total energy of the electron approximately equal to its rest energy, and the momentum reducing to the classical value,

and so the second equation may be written

which is of order  - thus at typical energies and velocities, the bottom components of the Dirac spinor in the standard representation are much suppressed in comparison to the top components. Substituting this expression into the first equation gives after some rearrangement

The operator on the left represents the particle energy reduced by its rest energy, which is just the classical energy, so we recover Pauli's theory if we identify his 2-spinor with the top components of the Dirac spinor in the non-relativistic approximation. A further approximation gives the Schrödinger equation as the limit of the Pauli theory. Thus the Schrödinger equation may be seen as the far non-relativistic approximation of the Dirac equation when one may neglect spin and work only at low energies and velocities. This also was a great triumph for the new equation, as it traced the mysterious  that appears in it, and the necessity of a complex wave function, back to the geometry of space-time through the Dirac algebra. It also highlights why the Schrödinger equation, although superficially in the form of a diffusion equation, actually represents the propagation of waves.

It should be strongly emphasized that this separation of the Dirac spinor into large and small components depends explicitly on a low-energy approximation. The entire Dirac spinor represents an irreducible whole, and the components we have just neglected to arrive at the Pauli theory will bring in new phenomena in the relativistic regime - antimatter and the idea of creation and annihilation of particles.

In a general case (if a certain linear function of electromagnetic field does not vanish identically), three out of four components of the spinor function in the Dirac equation can be algebraically eliminated, yielding an equivalent fourth-order partial differential equation for just one component. Furthermore, this remaining component can be made real by a gauge transform.

Measurement
The existence of the anomalous magnetic moment of the electron has been detected experimentally by magnetic resonance method. This allows the determination of hyperfine splitting of electron shell energy levels in atoms of protium and deuterium using the measured resonance frequency for several transitions.

The magnetic moment of the electron has been measured using a one-electron quantum cyclotron and quantum nondemolition spectroscopy. The spin frequency of the electron is determined by the -factor.

See also

 Spin (physics)
 Electron precipitation
 Bohr magneton
 Nuclear magnetic moment
 Nucleon magnetic moment
 Anomalous magnetic dipole moment
 Electron electric dipole moment
 Fine structure
 Hyperfine structure

References

Bibliography

 
 

Atomic physics
Electric dipole moment
Magnetic moment
Particle physics
Physical constants